Richard Henson (10 October 1864 – 29 November 1930) was an English cricketer. Henson's batting style is unknown, though it is known he was a left-arm slow-medium bowler. He was born at Ruddington, Nottinghamshire and died there too.

Henson made a single first-class appearance for Liverpool and District against Cambridge University in 1894 at Aigburth Cricket Ground, Liverpool. In a match which Cambridge University won by nine wickets, Henson batted twice, making 2 runs in Liverpool and District's first-innings before he was dismissed by Charles Pope, while in their second-innings he was dismissed for 17 runs by John Robinson. He also took two wickets for five runs in Cambridge University's first-innings, taking the wickets of Pope and Horace Gray, who were the last two wickets to fall in the innings. Below first-class level he appeared in a single match for Shropshire County Cricket Club in 1905.

References

External links
Richard Henson at ESPNcricinfo
Richard Henson at CricketArchive

1864 births
1930 deaths
People from Ruddington
Cricketers from Nottinghamshire
English cricketers
Liverpool and District cricketers